Moyers is an unincorporated community in Pendleton County, West Virginia, United States. Moyers is located at the junction of County Routes 23 and 25.

References

Unincorporated communities in Pendleton County, West Virginia
Unincorporated communities in West Virginia